The Janitor's Boy is a children's book by Andrew Clements.  Part of his school series, it was released by Simon & Schuster in 2000.

Plot Summary
The book tells the story of a school student, Jack Rankin, whose father is the janitor of his school. Jack is made fun of by his friends for this, and he hates his father because of it. Lashing out, he puts a massive quantity of bubble gum up under his desk so that his father will have to clean it off. Unfortunately, he is caught and ends up having to clean it up himself under the supervision of his father janitor. During this, he learns that it's very hard work to be a janitor, and learns of his father's dark past. He and his father become friends. As the book closes, a student shouts "You gonna be a janitor when you grow up too?!" and Jack says "Yes," and smiles up at his father's face, and says, "yes I do."

References

2000 American novels
Books by Andrew Clements
American children's novels
Novels set in Minnesota
Novels set in elementary and primary schools
2000 children's books
Works about janitors
Books illustrated by Brian Selznick